Kuri, or Nabi, is a small Austronesian language of the Bomberai Peninsula of New Guinea.  Lexically it is very close to Irarutu.

Distribution
Locations:

Kuri District in Teluk Bintuni Regency
Teluk Arguni District and Arguni Bawah District in Kaimana Regency: Pigo, Maskur, Tantura, Ergara, Kaimana, Tiwara, Owa, Bayeda, Moyana, Kokoroba, Nagura, Tugarni, Mahuwa, Fidumsa, Wawarsi, Tanusa, Warami, Baru, Tiwam, Mahua, Cowa, Bungsur, Weswasa, Burugrba, Sawi, Bobwer, Waho, Warmetia, Gusi, Afuafu, Burgerba, Mandiwa, Ukiara, Tuguwawa, Taner, Suga, Bufeur, Yainsei, Idoor, and Waromi villages.

References

Languages of western New Guinea